Drahobuz is a municipality and village in Litoměřice District in the Ústí nad Labem Region of the Czech Republic. It has about 300 inhabitants.

Administrative parts
Villages of Břehoryje and Strážiště are administrative parts of Drahobuz.

References

Villages in Litoměřice District